Stefan de Leval Jezierski (born March 22, 1954) is an American horn player and was the longest serving hornist of the Berlin Philharmonic Orchestra (Berliner Philharmoniker).

Born in Boston, he studied horn with Myron Bloom at the Cleveland Institute of Music and at the North Carolina School of the Arts.  While still a student he appeared as a soloist with members of the Cleveland Orchestra in Severance Hall and was shortly thereafter appointed principal horn of the Kassel State Opera orchestra.

In 1978 at the age of twenty-three, he was hired by Herbert von Karajan and the Berlin Philharmonic to play high horn. Until 2021 he was a member of the winds of the Berlin Philharmonic and co-founded the Scharoun Ensemble.  Appearing regularly as a soloist and chamber musician at major music festivals and concert venues throughout Europe, America, and Asia, he is also honorary professor at the Shanghai Conservatory of Music. Jezierski also taught at the Berliner Philharmoniker's academy, the Karajan Akademie.

His enthusiasm for playing jazz on the horn inspired him to form a jazz quintet with other top North American players living in Berlin and has led to onstage improvisations with notable musicians such as  Nigel Kennedy.  Countless LP's, CD's, and video recordings document his career.

External links
 Berlin Philharmonic entry 
 Scharoun Ensemble entry

American classical horn players
Living people
Players of the Berlin Philharmonic
American jazz horn players
Musicians from Boston
Cleveland Institute of Music alumni
20th-century classical musicians
20th-century American musicians
21st-century classical musicians
21st-century American musicians
American expatriates in Germany
1954 births
Jazz musicians from Massachusetts